Iliza Shlesinger: Unveiled is a 2019 American stand-up comedy film directed by Steve Paley and written by and starring Iliza Shlesinger, Iliza Shlesinger's fifth Netflix stand-up special, following War Paint from 2013, Freezing Hot from 2015, Confirmed Kills from 2016 and Elder Millennial from 2018. In Unveiled, the newlywed Iliza Shlesinger investigates marriage and its traditions. She discusses the required preparations as a woman, long-standing traditions as garters and veils, and the horror that is a bachelorette party. It was released on November 19, 2019, on Netflix.

References

External links 

 
 

2019 films
2019 comedy films
American comedy films
Netflix specials
Stand-up comedy concert films
2010s English-language films
2010s American films